Patrik Mennander (born 8 January 1976) is a Finnish singer who has been in the bands Ruoska, Battlelore and Natsipaska.

Short biography

Mennander was born in Finland in 1976.  He was in the Finnish army (the year he entered is unknown) until 1997.  A year later, in 1998, he then created the comic/hard rock band Natsipaska with Anssi Auvinen, Mika Kamppi and  Sami Karppinen.  The band released three albums before retiring in 2000.  Then, in 2002, with a guitarist, Kai Ahvenranta, Ruoska was started.  Although Ruoska is still an ongoing band, Patrik Mennander has not been there every single step of the way, since he left for the symphonic metal band Battlelore from end 2003 to near-end 2004, between the releases of Ruoska's second and third albums.  Since then, Mennander has stayed with Ruoska, and is best known as singer of Ruoska.

Mennander is also a tattoo artist at "His Master's Tattoo" in Mikkeli, Finland.

Discography

Reduced to Ash
Club Demonique (1999)

Ruoska
Kuori (2002)
Riisu (2003)
Radium (2005)
Amortem (2006)
Rabies (2008)

Battlelore
...Where the Shadows Lie (2002)
Sword's Song (2003)

Natsipaska
Suunnitelma 9 (1998)
Savo-texas sexmachine (1999)
Asfalttisoturit (2000)

References

External links
Ruoska official website
Battlelore official website

1976 births
Living people
People from Juva
Finnish heavy metal singers
21st-century Finnish male singers
Tattoo artists